Horace Ascher Brodzky (30 January 1885 – 11 February 1969) was an Australian-born artist and writer most of whose work was created in London and New York. His work included paintings, drawings and linocuts, of which he was an early pioneer. An associate in his early career of many leading artists working in Britain of his period, including Henri Gaudier-Brzeska, Mark Gertler, and members of the Vorticism movement, he ended his life relatively neglected.

Early life
Brodzky was born in Kew, Melbourne in 1885 to the Australian journalist Maurice Brodzky (a Jewish immigrant to Australia from Poland), and his wife Flora, née Leon. In his youth he assisted his father in the production of the magazine Table Talk.

Brodzky studied initially at the National Gallery School in Melbourne. In 1904 his father was bankrupted after exposing corruption, and Horace moved with his family to San Francisco.

London
In 1908, Brodzky went to London where he studied during 1911 at the City and Guilds South London Technical Art School. He became an acquaintance and follower of Walter Sickert. Amongst his friends was Henri Gaudier-Brzeska who created in 1913 a portrait bust of Brodzky (now in the Tate Gallery, London), and whose biography he wrote in 1933. Brodzky is said to have been so engrossed in talk when he visited Gaudier-Brzeska's studio in the King's Road, that he missed the last bus to Herne Hill where he lived. Brodzky travelled to Italy with the poet  John Gould Fletcher  and this led to his first London exhibition, "Paintings and Sketches of Italian and Sicilian Scenes" (c. 1911), of which one painting was selected for the 1912 Venice Biennale.  He was in fact the first Australian to be exhibited at the Biennale. In 1914 his work was exhibited along with that of other Jewish artists, including Mark Gertler and David Bomberg, in the Whitechapel Gallery. Brodzky became a member of The London Group. During this period he was a pioneer of the technique of linocut, in which medium he has been said to have "excelled". His early oils reveal the influence of both Gertler and Bomberg. Among his works of this period are portraits of Jacob Epstein and Jacob Kramer.

New York
In 1915 Brodzky moved to New York, with an introduction to the art patron John Quinn. There he worked as a poster artist and an arts journalist, and in 1917 helped Quinn organize a New York exhibition of Vorticist artists. In 1919 he married Bertha Greenfield; they were to have three sons. In 1920 Egmont Arens published in New York a collection of 21 of Brodzky's linoprints. Brodzky also designed book jackets for writers including Eugene O'Neill and Theodore Dreiser, and painted a portrait of O'Neill.

Back to England
Returning to London in 1923 he became a professional artist. His work featured in the first-ever exhibition of linocuts, organized by Claude Flight at the Redfern Gallery in  1929. Initial success however withered in the 1930s, when his marriage broke up, and from then on he lived in financial straits. In 1935 James Laver published a study  Forty Drawings by Horace Brodzky. Laver described Brodzky's drawing technique as follows:Brodzky prefers the ordinary 'dip-in' steel nib, for this enables the hand, by varying its pressure on the paper, to broaden the line at will, or rather in obedience to the obscure subconscious or half-conscious promptings which guide the hand to its task. He makes no preliminary studies, draws no pencil outline, carefully rubbed out afterwards to give a false impression of spontaneity. There are no erasures or alterations. Each drawing is made 'au premier coup'. It is made very quickly, as a unity, and when finished the artist cannot remember at what point it was started. The drawing has been thrown on the paper, as it were, with a single gesture.

In 1946 Brodzky published his own study of the French-Romanian-Jewish artist Jules Pascin. In London he lived for most of the rest of his life in the Kilburn and Willesden areas, continuing to produce paintings, drawings and linocuts. He supported himself by teaching and painting stage-decor and from 1948 to 1962 he was art-editor of the Antique Dealer and Collector's Guide, (founded by his brother Adrian).

Final years
In 1963, Brodzky wrote to the collector Ruth Borchard, who had just purchased from him a self-portrait for the sum of 12 guineas (£12.60):
Since 1911 I have been connected with the London art world & have exhibited at all important exhibitions…and have worked for modern art... For a long time I have sold none of my work & have had to rely on selling items by other artists that I have collected…This letter is not an angry complaint but just the plain facts that I thought you might like to know.

In 1965 80th anniversary exhibitions were organized for Brodzky at the Ben Uri Gallery and the Oxford Union Cellars. In 1967 some of his early linocuts were reissued in London in a signed edition of 60 prints. Brodzky died in Kilburn in 1969, when his estate was valued for probate at £7977. Exhibitions of Brodzky's work were held in the Jewish Museum of Australia (1988) and at the Boundary Gallery, London (1989).

References
Notes

Sources
 Anon 1 (n.d.). "Horace Brodzky", Ruth Borchard Collection website, accessed 28 September 2015.
 Anon 2 (n.d.). "Horace Brodzky (Biographical details)", British Museum website, accessed 29 September 2015. 
Cannon, Michael (1979). "Brodzky, Horace Ascher (1885–1969)", in Australian Dictionary of Biography online, accessed 28 September 2015.
Lambirth, Andrew (n.d.). "Brodzky, Horace Asher (1885–1969)" , in Oxford Dictionary of National Biography online, accessed 29 September 2015.
Lew, Henry R (1987) "Horace Brodzky" (Published by the Author) - The definitive biography on the artist - 
National Library of Australia Cataloguing-in-Publication data: ISBN O 7316 0197 1 
Weindling, Dick (2015). "Horace Brodzky, Kilburn artist",  in Kilburn and Willesden History website, accessed 28 September 2015.

External links
 

1885 births
1969 deaths
20th-century Australian artists
20th-century British artists
Alumni of the City and Guilds of London Art School
Artists from Melbourne
Australian Jews
Australian people of Polish-Jewish descent
Jewish artists
Modern painters
Australian expatriates in the United States
Australian emigrants to the United Kingdom
People from Kew, Victoria
National Gallery of Victoria Art School alumni